Charles Cornwallis Chesney (29 September 1826 – 19 March 1876) was a British soldier and military writer.

Family background and education
Chesney was born in County Down, Ireland, the third son of Charles Cornwallis Chesney, captain on the retired list of the Bengal Artillery. His uncle was Francis Rawdon Chesney, his younger brother was General George Tomkyns Chesney, and his older sister was the writer Matilda Marian Pullan.

He was educated at Blundell's School, Tiverton, and afterwards at the Royal Military Academy, Woolwich, he obtained his first commission as second lieutenant of engineers in 1845, passing out of the academy at the head of his term.

Career
Chesney's early military service was spent in the ordinary course of regimental duty at home and abroad, and he was stationed in New Zealand during the Crimean War. Among the various reforms in the British military system which followed from that war was the impetus given to military education; and in 1858 Captain Chesney was appointed professor of military history at the Royal Military College, Sandhurst.

In 1864, he succeeded Colonel (afterwards Sir) Edward Bruce Hamley in the corresponding chair at the Staff College. The writings of these two brilliant officers had a great influence not only at home, but on  Continental Europe and the United States. Chesney's first published work (1863) was an account of the American Civil War in Virginia, which went through several editions. But the work which attained the greatest reputation was his Waterloo Lectures (1868), prepared from the notes of lectures orally delivered at the Staff College.

Up to that time the English literature on the Waterloo campaign, although voluminous, was made up of personal reminiscences or of formal records, useful materials for history rather than history itself; and the French accounts had mainly taken the form of fiction. In Chesney's lucid and vigorous account of the momentous struggle, while it illustrates both the strategy and tactics which culminated in the final catastrophe, the mistakes committed by Napoleon I of France are laid bare, and for the first time an English writer is found to point out that the dispositions of Arthur Wellesley, 1st Duke of Wellington were far from faultless. And in the Waterloo Lectures the Prussians are for the first time credited by an English pen with their proper share in the victory. The work attracted much attention abroad as well as at home, and French and German translations were published.

Chesney was for many years a constant contributor to the newspaper press and to periodic literature, devoting himself for the most part to the critical treatment of military operations, and professional subjects generally. Some of his essays on military biography, contributed mainly to the Edinburgh Review, were afterwards published separately in 1874. In 1868 he was appointed a member of the Royal Commission on Military Education, under the presidency first of Earl de Grey and afterwards of Frederick Hamilton-Temple-Blackwood, 1st Marquess of Dufferin and Ava, to whose recommendations were due the improved organization of the military colleges, and the development of military education in the principal military stations of the British army.

In 1871, on the conclusion of the Franco-Prussian War, he was sent on a special mission to the French Third Republic and the German Empire, and furnished to the government a series of valuable reports on the different siege operations which had been carried out during the war, especially the two sieges of Paris. These reports were published in a large volume, which was issued confidentially.

He was appointed lieutenant-colonel in 1873, and at the time of his death he was commanding Royal Engineer of the London district.

Death and burial
Chesney was abstemious and, overwork of mind and body telling at last on a frail constitution, he died on 19 March 1876 following a short illness. He was buried at Sandhurst.

Assessment
Never seeking regimental or staff preferment, Colonel Chesney never obtained any, but he held at the time of his death a unique position in the army, altogether apart from and above his actual place in it. He was consulted by officers of all grades on professional matters, and few have done more to raise the intellectual standard of the British officer. Constantly engaged in literary pursuits, he was nevertheless laborious and exemplary in the discharge of his public duties, while managing also to devote a large part of his time to charitable and religious offices.

References

Attribution:

Sources

External links
Patrick M. Kirkwood, "The Impact of Fiction on Public Debate in Late Victorian Britain: The Battle of Dorking and the 'Lost Career' of Sir George Tomkyns Chesney", The Graduate History Review 4, No. 1 (Fall, 2012), 1–16.

1826 births
1876 deaths
Royal Engineers officers
People educated at Blundell's School
Graduates of the Royal Military Academy, Woolwich
People from County Down
British military writers